Korba Super Thermal Power Plant is located at Jamnipali in Korba district in the Indian state of Chhattisgarh. The power plant is one of the coal-based power plants of National Thermal Power Corporation (NTPC). The coal for the power plant is sourced from Kusmunda and Gevra Mines. The source of water for the power plant is Hasdeo River.

Capacity

Transport
Korba Super Thermal Power Plant is located on the Champa-Gevra Road branch line.

References

External links
 NTPC Korba

Coal-fired power stations in Chhattisgarh
Korba district
Korba, Chhattisgarh
1983 establishments in Madhya Pradesh
Energy infrastructure completed in 1983
20th-century architecture in India